Cardona is a Uruguayan municipality located in the department of Soriano. Its seat is the city of Cardona.

History 
The municipality of Cardona was created on March 15, 2010, by Law 18653, located within the department of Soriano, comprising the MFA constituency of the department.

References 

Cardona